Stobno  is a village in the administrative district of Gmina Kołbaskowo, within Police County, West Pomeranian Voivodeship, in north-western Poland, close to the German border.

The village has a population of 450.

History
The village dates back to the Middle Ages. The territory became part of the emerging Polish state in the 10th century under Mieszko I of Poland, and following the fragmentation of Poland it formed part of the Duchy of Pomerania. The village was first mentioned in documents in 1243, when Barnim I, Duke of Pomerania granted it to a nunnery from nearby Szczecin. From 1871 to 1945 it was part of Germany, and following Germany's defeat in World War II it became again part of Poland.

References

Stobno